Venu is an Indian masculine given name. Notable people with this name include:

K. Venu (Kerala), Naxalite leader from Kerala 
K. Venu (Tamil Nadu politician), Indian politician
Kurma Venu Gopalaswamy, Indian lawyer
Master Venu, Indian composer
Nedumudi Venu, Indian actor
Nerella Venu Madhav, Indian ventriloquist
P. Venu, Indian film director 
Venu Arvind, Tamil actor
Venu, Indian cinematographer
Venu Madhav (actor), Indian comedian
Venu Nagavally, Indian actor
Venu Nair, Indian film director 
Venu Ravichandran, Indian film producer
Venu Srinivasan, Indian businessman
Venu Thottempudi, an Indian Actor
Venu V. Desom, Malayalam poet

Indian masculine given names